Rafton John Pounder (13 May 1933 — 16 April 1991) was a Pro-Assembly Unionist and Conservative Party Westminster MP from Northern Ireland.

Born at Ballynahatty, Shaw's Bridge, Belfast, the son of Cuthbert C. Pounder, Rafton Pounder was educated at Rockport School, Charterhouse and at Christ's College, Cambridge, where he was Chairman of the Conservative Association (CUCA).

He was elected Westminster Member of Parliament for Belfast South in a 1963 by-election, and served until February 1974 when he lost as a Pro-Assembly Unionist to the Reverend Robert Bradford of the United Ulster Unionist Coalition. Pounder was also a Member of the European Parliament from 1973 to 1974. From 1964 to 1967, he served as Secretary of the Ulster Unionist Parliamentary Party.

Married to Valerie Isobel (daughter of Robert Stewart MBE), with one son, Aidan, and one daughter, Helen, he lived at Groomsport, County Down, until his death at age 57. He is outlived by his granddaughters, Charlotte, Kate, Iona and Penelope.

References

Sources

Times Guide to the House of Commons February 1974

External links 
 

1933 births
1991 deaths
Ulster Unionist Party members of the House of Commons of the United Kingdom
Members of the Parliament of the United Kingdom for Belfast constituencies (since 1922)
People educated at Charterhouse School
UK MPs 1959–1964
UK MPs 1964–1966
UK MPs 1966–1970
UK MPs 1970–1974
MEPs for the United Kingdom 1973–1979
Alumni of Christ's College, Cambridge
People educated at Rockport School